This is the top 15 male Olympic swimming gold medals.

This is the top 15 female Olympic swimming gold medalists:

Individual events

All swimmers with at least four individual gold medals are listed.

Men

Women

See also
 List of World Aquatics Championships medalists in swimming (men)
 List of World Aquatics Championships medalists in swimming (women)
 List of Olympic medalists in swimming (men)
 List of Olympic medalists in swimming (women)
 List of individual gold medalists in swimming at the Olympics and World Aquatics Championships (men)
 List of individual gold medalists in swimming at the Olympics and World Aquatics Championships (women)
 List of gold medalist relay teams in swimming at the Olympics and World Aquatics Championships
 European Aquatics Championships – Multiple medalists in swimming

References
HistoFINA SWIMMING MEDALLISTS AND STATISTICS AT OLYMPIC GAMES
List of multiple Olympic gold medalists

Olympics top
Swimming statistics
Lists of Olympic medalists